Professor Abiodun Adebayo is a professor of biochemistry and he is the current vice-chancellor of Covenant University. He is also a member of the accreditation panel of National Universities Commission.

Biography 
Professor Abiodun Humphrey Adebayo who is the current Vice-Chancellor is an elected member of the governing board of the Association of African Universities (AAU). He was also elected into the governing council of the Association of Commonwealth Universities where he serves as a Council member and Trustee. He is a Fellow of the Nigerian Young Academy and the Chartered Institute of Administration. 

Prof. Adebayo obtained a B.Sc. (Honours) degree in Biochemistry from the University of Calabar in 2000. He later proceeded to the University of Jos in 2003 and was awarded an M.Sc. degree in Biochemistry in 2005. Adebayo was awarded a PhD degree in Biochemistry by Covenant University, Ota in 2009. He undertook a postdoctoral study at the Institute of Microbiology, Chinese Academy of Sciences in 2012-2013. 

He specialized in Plant Biochemistry and has been actively involved in the sustainable use of indigenous medicinal plants. His main research focus is on phytochemical, biochemical and toxicity studies of medicinal plants. His research on medicinal plants involves the purification, isolation and characterization of active compounds from plants; these compounds are in turn screened for anticancer, antiviral, antimicrobial and antioxidant properties. Prof. Adebayo is also involved in the safety evaluation of locally used medicinal plants using biochemical, haematological and histopathological indices of toxicity. 

Prof. Adebayo, who is a recipient of the prestigious Chinese Academy of Sciences (CAS) and the Academy of Sciences for the Developing World (TWAS) Fellowship awards, has published in reputable local and international journals. His astuteness has earned him three times prize of Covenant University High Impact Journal publication awards for the years 2010, 2011 and 2012. He won a research equipment grant from the Ministry of Science and Technology, China. His research group won the TWAS Research grant for carrying out a study on the “Preclinical evaluation of novel computational-aided designed compounds as antimalarial drug candidates”. The fund also made provision for the award of scholarship for MSc. Students. Prof. Adebayo reviews some high impact journals. He is also listed on the editorial board of some international journals. 

Prof. Adebayo’s biography was listed and published in the 30th edition of Marquis Who’s Who in the World in the United States. Prof. Adebayo who was the chair of the Covenant University Farm Board and Drug Procurement Committee and a Professor in the Department of Biochemistry was a former Dean of the School of Postgraduate Studies, Covenant University, Ota, Ogun State, Nigeria.

Source: https://staff.covenantuniversity.edu.ng/members/prof-adebayo-humphrey/

References 

Living people
Year of birth missing (living people)
University of Calabar alumni
University of Jos alumni
Covenant University alumni
Covenant University people